Luiz Freitas (born 3 August 1967) is a Brazilian boxer. He competed in the men's flyweight event at the 1992 Summer Olympics. He held a 20-2-0 record in professional boxing (16 KOs).

References

External links
 

1967 births
Living people
Brazilian male boxers
Olympic boxers of Brazil
Boxers at the 1992 Summer Olympics
Place of birth missing (living people)
Flyweight boxers
Pan American Games medalists in boxing
Medalists at the 1991 Pan American Games
Pan American Games bronze medalists for Brazil
Boxers at the 1991 Pan American Games
20th-century Brazilian people
21st-century Brazilian people